The 1993 Florida State Seminoles football team represented Florida State University and were the national champions of the 1993 NCAA Division I-A football season. The team was coached by Bobby Bowden and played their home games at Doak Campbell Stadium.

The season gave the Seminoles their first national title as well as their first Heisman winner in quarterback Charlie Ward.

Season
FSU beat its first five opponents by an average score of 46–3, during which linebacker Derrick Brooks outscored all five opponents combined. The Seminoles' first real contest didn't come until October 9, when the third ranked Miami Hurricanes came to Tallahassee with a 31-game regular season win streak. That game was sealed when FSU safety Devin Bush picked off a Frank Costa pass and ran it back 40 yards for a Florida State touchdown, making the score 28–10 with 4:59 to play.

On November 13, 1993, Florida State played Notre Dame in a matchup of unbeaten teams. FSU was ranked #1 and Notre Dame was ranked #2. In a matchup hailed as the "Game of the Century", the Seminoles bid for a perfect season fell short as Notre Dame prevailed, 31–24. The Irish had leads of 24–7 and 31–17 before the Seminoles scored late (on a pass tipped in the end zone) to cut the final margin to seven points.  After that game, Notre Dame was voted #1 and FSU was voted #2.

However, #1 Notre Dame lost at home the following week to #17 Boston College 41–39 on a 41-yard field goal as time expired.  The voters returned the Seminoles to the #1 spot, and they were matched against Nebraska (now #2) in the Orange Bowl. Florida State rallied late to eke out an 18–16 win, as Nebraska missed a potential game-winning 45-yard field goal on the game's final play.  After the bowl games, 12–1 Florida State was voted #1 and 11–1 Notre Dame was voted #2 in both polls.

Schedule

Roster

Starting lineup

Offense

Defense

Special teams

Rankings

Season summary

Kansas

at Duke

Clemson

at North Carolina

Georgia Tech

Miami (FL)

Virginia

Wake Forest

at Maryland

at Notre Dame

NC State

at Florida

vs. Nebraska (Orange Bowl)

Awards and honors
Charlie Ward, Heisman Trophy
Charlie Ward, Johnny Unitas Award
Charlie Ward, James E. Sullivan Award
Charlie Ward, Walter Camp Award
Charlie Ward, Maxwell Award
Charlie Ward, Davey O'Brien Award

1993 team players in the NFL
The following were selected in the 1994 NFL Draft.

The following would play in the NFL in later years.
Derrick Brooks
Sam Cowart
Kez McCorvey
Warrick Dunn
Derrick Alexander
Tamarick Vanover
Clay Shiver

References

Florida State
Florida State Seminoles football seasons
College football national champions
Atlantic Coast Conference football champion seasons
Orange Bowl champion seasons
Florida State Seminoles football